Toll-like receptor 1 (TIL) is a member of the toll-like receptor family (TLR) of pattern recognition receptors of the innate immune system. TIL recognizes pathogen-associated molecular pattern with a specificity for gram-positive bacteria. TIL has also been designated as CD281 (cluster of differentiation 281).

TLRs are highly conserved from Drosophila to humans and share structural and functional similarities. They recognize pathogen-associated molecular patterns (PAMPs) that are expressed on infectious agents, and mediate the production of cytokines necessary for the development of effective immunity. The various TLRs exhibit different patterns of expression. This gene is ubiquitously expressed, and at higher levels than other TLR genes. Different length transcripts presumably resulting from use of alternative polyadenylation site, and/or from alternative splicing, have been noted for this gene.

TLR1 recognizes peptidoglycan and (triacyl) lipopeptides in concert with TLR2 (as a heterodimer). Toll-like receptors, including TLR-1, found on the epithelial cell layer that lines the small and large intestine are important players in the management of the gut microbiota and detection of pathogens. It is also found on the surface of macrophages and neutrophils.

Interactions 

TLR 1 has been shown to interact with TLR 2.

References

External links 
 
 PDBe-KB provides an overview of all the structure information available in the PDB for Human Toll-like receptor 1 (TLR1)

 

Clusters of differentiation
1